Lepidostoma is a genus of bizarre caddisflies in the family Lepidostomatidae. There are more than 150 described species in Lepidostoma.

See also
 List of Lepidostoma species

References

Further reading

External links

 

Trichoptera genera
Articles created by Qbugbot
Integripalpia